Kreuzlingen Bernrain railway station is a railway station in the municipality of Kreuzlingen, in the Swiss canton of Thurgau. It is an intermediate stop on the standard gauge Wil–Kreuzlingen line of THURBO. It is one of four stations within the municipality of Kreuzlingen.

Services 
The following services stop at Kreuzlingen Bernrain:

 St. Gallen S-Bahn : half-hourly service between Weinfelden and Konstanz.

References

External links 
 
 

Railway stations in the canton of Thurgau
THURBO stations